Mark Parker (born October 21, 1955) is an American businessman. He serves as executive chairman of Nike, Inc. He was named the third CEO of the company in 2006 and served as president and CEO until 13 January 2020. As of January 12, 2023, he was elected as the next Chairman of The Walt Disney Company, which will go into effect at the company's next shareholder meeting.

Personal life
Parker was born in Poughkeepsie, New York, the son of Meg and Bruce Parker. He graduated from Westhill High School in Stamford, CT and later earned his bachelor's degree in Political Science at Penn State University in 1977. He is married to Kathy Parker and has three children, Jennifer, Meg Elizabeth, and Matthew. He ran on the Penn State track and cross country teams.

Art collection
Parker is an avid arts supporter with an extensive ongoing collection of modern, low brow and underground contemporary art, along with many other one-of-a-kind collectibles, including a cursed monkey. Notable artists from Parker's collection include Andy Warhol, Adonna Khare, Mark Ryden, Todd Schorr, Tim Biskup, Eric White, Sebastian Kruger, Charles Krafft, Glennray Tutor, Robert Crumb, Chris Mars, Sarina Brewer, and Michael Leavitt. Parker keeps a pair of bat-boots Nike designed for Michael Keaton to wear in the 1989 Batman movie. Other notable items include rare movie ephemera such as original props such as Star Wars C-3PO and models from Mars Attacks! (1996), The Day the Earth Stood Still (1951) and Back to the Future (1985).

Career
Parker joined Nike in 1979 as a footwear designer based in its R&D facility in Exeter, New Hampshire. He became Division Vice President in charge of development in 1987, Corporate Vice President in 1989, General Manager in 1993, and Vice President of Global Footwear in 1998. Prior to becoming vice president of Nike, he served as co-president (with Charlie Denson) of the Nike brand beginning in March 2001. He still participates in shoe design, most notably on the Nike HTM project, creating limited edition footwear alongside Nike designer Tinker Hatfield and creative consultant Hiroshi Fujiwara. He has committed to ensuring that Nike remain environmentally conscious. After 10 years of work, Parker and his team launched the first "Green Shoe" that adheres to the principles of sustainability. He is also responsible for other brands in Nike's portfolio, including Converse Inc. 

While CEO of Nike in 2012, Mark G. Parker earned a total compensation of $15,425,608, which included a base salary of $1,609,615, a cash bonus of $594,190, stocks granted of $3,500,087, options granted of $4,199,250, and non-equity incentive plan compensation listed at $5,522,466. After being promoted to Chairman in 2016, Mark Parker's compensation tripled to over $47.6 million - $33.5 million of which came from stock rewards.

In 2015, Mark Parker was named Fortune's Businessperson of the year.

It was announced in June 2015 that Mark Parker is replacing Phil Knight as company chairman of Nike in 2016.

In 2016, he ranked 14th in the New York Times' list of highest paid CEOs with an annual paycheck of 47.6 million. Parker was elected onto Walt Disney's board of directors early 2016.

In 2017, Parker took a 71% pay cut due to a year of poor sales at Nike and the layoff of 1,000 employees. Subsequently, his earnings were $13.9 million from stock and options.

In 2019, Mark Parker was criticized by certain right wing media commentators for his embrace of Nike endorser Colin Kaepernick. Some groups claim that Nike has recently shown a far-left bias in regard to advertising and business practices. Additionally, Parker was criticized for discontinuing a special edition of their Air Max 1 Quick Strike "Betsy Ross flag"-themed sneakers.

In October 2019, Mark Parker announced he will step down as Nike's CEO and become executive chairman of the company on January 13, 2020.

References

Living people
Businesspeople from Poughkeepsie, New York
Pennsylvania State University alumni
Nike, Inc. people
American chairpersons of corporations
American chief executives of fashion industry companies
American retail chief executives
American chief executives of manufacturing companies
Shoe designers
Directors of The Walt Disney Company
1955 births